Chico's tyrannulet (Zimmerius chicomendesi) is a species of passerine bird in the family Tyrannidae. It is endemic to the area of Rio Madeirinha in Brazil. Its natural habitat is subtropical or tropical moist montane forests.

Chico's tyrannulet was first described by the ornithologists Bret Whitney and colleagues in 2013 and given the binomial name Zimmerius chicomendesi in honour of Chico Mendes. The new species has been recognised by the South American Classification Committee of the American Ornithological Society and by Frank Gill and David Donsker who maintain an online list of bird species on behalf of the International Ornithological Committee.

References

Chico's tyrannulet
Birds of the Amazon Basin
Endemic birds of Brazil
Chico's tyrannulet